Ann C. Frank Lewis (born December 19, 1937) is a leading American Democratic Party strategist and communicator. Lewis served as White House Communications Director in the Clinton administration and in senior roles under Hillary Clinton. She is currently the co-chair of the Democratic Majority for Israel.

Personal life 
Lewis was born to a Jewish family in 1937 in Jersey City, New Jersey. She is the older sister of former United States Congressman Barney Frank. She attended Radcliffe College, the former women's college within Harvard University in Cambridge, Massachusetts, but did not graduate. While there, she met Gerald A. Lewis, whom she married and with whom she subsequently moved to Florida. They divorced in 1968 and Lewis moved back to Massachusetts. Ann married Myron Sponder in 1989.

Career

Early career 
From 1994 to 1995, Lewis was the vice president for public policy at the Planned Parenthood Federation of America, where she was responsible for policy, legal and communications initiatives. She has served as the national director of Americans for Democratic Action, as the political director for the Democratic National Committee, and as chief of staff to then Congresswoman Barbara Mikulski.

She served as political director of the Democratic National Committee (DNC) from 1981 to 1985.

Clinton White House 
Lewis was director of communications and deputy campaign manager for the Clinton-Gore Reelection Campaign in 1995 to 1996. From 1997 to 2000, Lewis served as director of communications and counselor to President Bill Clinton in the White House.

Hillary Clinton (2000–2008) 
Lewis served as senior advisor to Hillary Clinton's 2000 campaign for U.S. Senate. She served as director of communications for HillPAC and Friends of Hillary 2005 to 2007. She also served as national chair of the DNC Women's Vote Center, where she led the Democratic Party's major initiative to reach, engage, and mobilize women voters from 2003 to 2004.

Hillary Clinton 2008 presidential campaign 
Lewis was senior advisor for Hillary Clinton's 2008 – 2016 presidential campaign.

Lewis was co-chair for Jewish Women for Hillary 2016.

Recent work 
Following the conclusion of Clinton's 2008 presidential campaign, Lewis founded NoLimits.org, an issue-based educational organization enabling individuals to stay engaged and active on issues such as health care reform, economic and work-family policies, international and national women's rights, security matters, and other issues and policies championed by Hillary Clinton. She is currently serving as president of the JAC Education Foundation.

Academia 
In 2001, Lewis was the Richman Visiting Professor at Brandeis University, teaching a course on the Presidency entitled "The West Wing and The Real World" and a Public Policy Fellow at the Annenberg School of Communications of the University of Pennsylvania.

Lewis was appointed by President Clinton as co-chair of the President's Commission on the Celebration of Women in American History, and she was appointed by the President and Senator Daschle to the Women's Progress Commission, established by Congress to report on women's historical sites. She chaired the U.S. Government Working Group for the Women 2000: Beijing Plus Five Special Session of the General Assembly.

Women's Suffrage Collection 

Lewis maintains the Ann Lewis Women's Suffrage Collection, an archive of suffrage-related objects and ephemera.

Affiliations 
Lewis was a board member of the Jewish Women's Archive. She participated in the 1971 founding meeting of the National Women's Political Caucus in Houston, Texas and was chosen to serve on its operating committee.

Lewis was a supporter of Ready for Hillary, a national grassroots political action committee that organized grassroots support ahead of Hillary Clinton's 2016 presidential campaign.

Lewis is a member of the national advisory board for Emerge America.

Writing and statements 
Lewis is the author of "The West Wing: An Insider's View" in the Spring 2001 edition of Television Quarterly, the journal of the National Academy of Television Arts and Sciences, and other articles about American politics. She served on the advisory committee for the book Jews and American Politics, published in the fall of 2001, and is a member of the board of the Jewish Women's Archive.

A regular speaker on politics and current events in the United States, Lewis delivered the keynote address to the European Forum in Alpbach, Austria, in 1999 on "Media and Democracy". She was a member of the U.S. delegations to the Vital Voices "Dawn of a New Millennium" Conference in Reykjavík, Iceland and to the European Preparatory session for the Beijing Plus Five Session in Geneva; led workshops in South Africa in preparation for the first-ever democratic elections in that country, and has participated in training seminars for political leaders in Eastern Europe.

Representing Hillary Clinton's campaign in a March 17, 2008 United Jewish Communities forum in Washington, Ann Lewis was quoted as saying "The role of the president of the United States is to support the decisions that are made by the people of Israel. It is not up to us to pick and choose from among the political parties".

Awards 
In 2002, Lewis was nominated for an Emmy Award for her work on the script America: A Tribute to Heroes, broadcast on all networks following the September 11 attacks.

In June 2009, Lewis was honored with the inaugural National Jewish Democratic Council's Belle Moskowitz Award in Washington, D.C. President Bill Clinton was the special guest. Other notable guests included Secretary of Health and Human Services Kathleen Sebelius, Senator Kirsten Gillibrand, Congressman Barney Frank, former Congressman Martin Frost, and Frank R. Lautenberg.

In 2015 she was named as one of The Forward 50.

References

External links

Ann Lewis, Honored

|-

1937 births
American women chief executives
American political consultants
American political writers
American television writers
American women screenwriters
Counselors to the President
Clinton administration personnel
Radcliffe College alumni
Jewish American screenwriters
Jewish American government officials
Living people
Massachusetts Democrats
Politicians from Jersey City, New Jersey
White House Communications Directors
Writers from Massachusetts
Writers from Jersey City, New Jersey
American women non-fiction writers
American women television writers
21st-century American women